Beit HaKerem Valley, also known as al-Shaghur, is a valley in the Galilee region in northern Israel.

The valley is the dividing feature between the Upper Galilee featuring relatively high mountains and the Lower Galilee to the south, with lower mountains.

The five Arab local authorities (Bi'ina, Deir al-Asad, Majd al-Krum, Nahf and Rameh) and two Jewish local authorities (Karmiel and Misgav) of the Beit HaKerem Valley have formed a "cluster" of municipalities, connecting municipal leaders to create long-term development strategies, enhance economic development, and attract and receive additional government funding.

See also
Geography of Israel

References

Valleys of Israel